The Trentino-Alto Adige/Südtirol regional election of 1948 took place on 28 November 1948.  It was the first election ever. Proportional representation was used.

Under provisions of the autonomy laws, the Provincial Council of Trento and the Provincial Council of Bolzano were established as sections of the Regional Council.

The Christian Democracy and the South Tyrolean People's Party won the election.

Results

Regional Council

Provincial Council of Trento

Provincial Council of Bolzano

Elections in Trentino-Alto Adige/Südtirol
1948 elections in Italy